This article is about the particular significance of the year 2008 to Nigeria and its people.

Incumbents

Federal government
 President: Umaru Musa Yar'Adua (PDP)
 Vice President: Goodluck Jonathan (PDP)
 Senate President: David Mark (PDP)
 House Speaker: Dimeji Bankole (PDP)
 Chief Justice: Idris Legbo Kutigi

Governors
 Abia State: Theodore Orji (PDP)
 Adamawa State: Murtala Nyako (PDP)
 Akwa Ibom State: Godswill Akpabio (PDP)
 Anambra State: Peter Obi (APGA)
 Bauchi State: Isa Yuguda (ANPP)
 Bayelsa State: Timipre Sylva (PDP)
 Benue State: Gabriel Suswam (PDP)
 Borno State: Ali Modu Sheriff (ANPP)
 Cross River State: Liyel Imoke (PDP)
 Delta State: Emmanuel Uduaghan (PDP)
 Ebonyi State: Martin Elechi (PDP)
 Edo State: Adams Aliyu Oshiomle (AC)
 Ekiti State: Olusegun Oni (PDP)
 Enugu State: Sullivan Chime (PDP)
 Gombe State: Mohammed Danjuma Goje (PDP)
 Imo State: Ikedi Ohakim (PDP)
 Jigawa State: Sule Lamido (PDP)
 Kaduna State: Namadi Sambo (PDP)
 Kano State: Ibrahim Shekarau (ANPP)
 Katsina State: Ibrahim Shema (PDP)
 Kebbi State: Usman Saidu Nasamu Dakingari (PDP)
 Kogi State: Ibrahim Idris (PDP)
 Kwara State: Bukola Saraki (AC)
 Lagos State: Babatunde Fashola (AC)
 Nasarawa State: Aliyu Doma (PDP)
 Niger State: Mu'azu Babangida Aliyu (PDP)
 Ogun State: Gbenga Daniel (PDP)
 Ondo State: Olusegun Agagu (PDP)
 Osun State: Olagunsoye Oyinlola (PDP)
 Oyo State: Christopher Alao-Akala (PDP)
 Plateau State: Jonah David Jang (PDP)
 Rivers State: Chibuike Amaechi (PDP)
 Sokoto State: Aliyu Magatakarda Wamakko (PDP)
 Taraba State: Danbaba Suntai (PDP)
 Yobe State: Mamman Bello Ali (ANPP)
Zamfara State: Mahmud Shinkafi (PDP)

Events
 April 26 - 4th Africa Movie Academy Awards take place in Abuja.
 May 16 - 2008 Ijegun pipeline explosion occurs killing between 10 and 100 people.
 August - Nigeria competes at the 2008 Summer Olympics winning 6 medals.
 September - Nigeria competes at the 2008 Summer Paralympics winning 9 medals.

Deaths
 April 27 - Abraham Adesanya, politician, lawyer and activist (born 1922).
 May 24 - Sonny Okosun, musician (born 1947).

References

 
Years of the 21st century in Nigeria
Nigeria
2000s in Nigeria